The Wachusett Aqueduct is a secondary aqueduct that carries water from the Wachusett Reservoir to the John J. Carroll Water Treatment Plant at Walnut Hill in Marlborough, Massachusetts. It is part of the public water supply system for the communities of Greater Boston that are served by the Massachusetts Water Resources Authority (MWRA), which manages the aqueduct. The aqueduct serves as a standby backup to the Cosgrove Tunnel.

Physical characteristics
The Wachusett Aqueduct extends from the Wachusett Reservoir in Clinton, through Berlin and Northborough, to the John J. Carroll Water Treatment Plant at Walnut Hill in Marlborough, Massachusetts. It is not constructed entirely underground and there are several elevated sections. The final portion of the aqueduct, taken out of service in 2005 with the opening of the treatment plant, is an open channel running from near the treatment facility to Sudbury Reservoir.

Modern use
Until the 1960s, the Wachusett Aqueduct was the main conduit used to deliver water from the Wachusett Reservoir. At that time, it carried  of water each day (13 m3/s). The Cosgrove Tunnel replaced it in 1965 as the primary water transmission aqueduct. Because of the construction of the Walnut Hill Water Treatment Plant in Marlborough, the Cosgrove Tunnel was shut down in 2003 in order to make the large piping connection between the new treatment plant and the MWRA's new MetroWest Water Supply Tunnel. The MetroWest Tunnel extends east 18.6 miles (29.9 km) from Walnut Hill to Weston. The section of the Wachusett Aqueduct between the Wachusett Reservoir and the treatment plant remains a standby backup transmission path in the event the Cosgrove Tunnel is unavailable, while the open channel between the treatment plant and the Sudbury Reservoir remains an emergency backup transmission path in the event of a major problem with the treatment plant or the primary transmission pathways between the treatment plant and the water system.

The aqueduct's route and supporting structures were added to the National Register of Historic Places in 1990.

References

Further reading

Metropolitan Boston water system history
Aqueduct over-crossing on State Route 20
Legal brief by the United States Army Corps of Engineers
March 19, 2001 start of Wachusett Aqueduct rehabilitation
EPA permit to discharge effluent while repairing the Wachusett Aqueduct
Court order and statement of facts about MWRA facilities

External links
 Online Historic Water System Photos and Plans at mass.gov

Aqueducts in Massachusetts
Aqueducts in Middlesex County, Massachusetts
Transportation buildings and structures in Worcester County, Massachusetts
Historic districts in Middlesex County, Massachusetts
Historic districts in Worcester County, Massachusetts
National Register of Historic Places in Worcester County, Massachusetts
National Register of Historic Places in Middlesex County, Massachusetts
Aqueducts on the National Register of Historic Places
Transportation buildings and structures on the National Register of Historic Places in Massachusetts
Buildings and structures in Marlborough, Massachusetts